William Maclay may refer to:
 William Maclay (Pennsylvania senator) (1737–1804), United States Senator from Pennsylvania
 William Maclay (Pennsylvania representative) (1765–1825), United States Representative from Pennsylvania
 William Plunkett Maclay (1774–1842), United States Representative from Pennsylvania
 William B. Maclay (1812–1882), United States Representative from New York
 William P. Maclay (Medal of Honor) (1877–1943), Philippine Insurrection Medal of Honor recipient

See also  
 William Macleay (disambiguation)